The office of Mayor-President of Baton Rouge, Louisiana was formally created in 1846 as the chief executive of the City of Baton Rouge, Louisiana, which has been the state capital of Louisiana continuously since 1849 (except for a brief time during and after the Civil War when Opelousas, Shreveport, or New Orleans held that title).

Background

Baton Rouge was granted the right to incorporate in 1817 under legislation approved by Louisiana's second governor, Jacques Villeré. The city was chartered the following year and led by a magistrate who was chosen among the popularly-elected, five-member board of selectmen. Selectmen were up for election annually.

Early mayors also served one-year terms. The office had a two-year term in the 1880s and was increased to four years in duration in 1898.

The first mayoral election in 1846 was between James Cooper (who had previously served as a magistrate) and John Dufrocq, a Whig Party member who won the balloting. In 1856 another noteworthy race occurred, this time between Know Nothing mayor Joseph Monget and his Democratic challenger, Edward Cousinard; after actually tying in the popular vote, the commissioners of election decided to award the election to the incumbent. Cousinard later won the mayor's seat himself in the 1857 election.

The city's government essentially ceased to exist for the duration of the Civil War, once the Battle of Baton Rouge had begun in 1862. It was also largely stripped of influence at one point by the First Reconstruction Act, which was issued in 1867.

Multiple mayoral elections during the Reconstruction Era were disputed. After the 1871 election Gov. Henry Clay Warmoth did what he legally could from the temporary capitol in New Orleans to briefly prop up the new African American Republican mayor, who was facing an overwhelmingly Democratic-controlled board of selectmen—but in 1872 Warmoth himself was facing a mounting impeachment effort and forced to broaden what remained of his support by reaching out to Democrats who had a much more solid base in Louisiana than the Republicans did; he declared the disputed 1872 election results null and void, and awarded the state's commission to the Democratic candidate. Ultimately, the 1872–73 term essentially ended up with two separately-functioning city governments, one recognized primarily by African American and pro-Union white Republicans (including so-called "carpetbaggers" and "scalawags") and one recognized primarily by native white Democrats. Although the term "city council" had been used on occasion before, the board of selectmen really seems to have begun transitioning over to the use of the term under the Republican mayor that year, perhaps in anticipation of needing to differentiate it from the competing board of selectmen that the Democrats were in the process of setting up (the board finally formally adopted the title "city council" in 1874). The Republicans had shown improvements in their organizational efforts (and electoral strength in general) by being able to win the 1872 election without Warmoth's help—and then by holding a share of the government for the duration of the term. While the Democratic mayor, James Elam, had been willing to fight to hang on to his seat after the disputed votes of 1871 and 1872, he either determined that he had no chance at the ballot box in the 1873 annual municipal elections or he simply no longer felt up to the challenge any more (he did, in fact, die only several months after the scheduled election date). Shortly before the election was to be held, African American state senator J. Henri Burch, a prominent area Republican, met with Elam, and they negotiated a compromise where Elam would resign his position and support new governor William Pitt Kellogg's appointment of the Republican incumbent to the mayor's seat—along with three Republicans and three Democrats to the city council (as selected by a conference committee). This compromise was largely acceptable to both sides (very rare for Reconstruction), although a rogue faction of the Democrats did attempt to hold their own election for the council (which failed to draw many to the polls and apparently quickly faded away).

After making it through 1873 relatively peacefully, Kellogg also appointed the mayor in 1874. The Republicans did win a municipal election in their own right in 1875, but in 1876 the Democrats were able to use various forms of intimidation, including by former members of the old Knights of the White Camelia, to regain the mayor's seat for the first of 28 consecutive Democratic chief executives.

In 1914 the city began using a city commission government under then-mayor Alex Grouchy, Jr. (it had already been in the works before the sudden death of Mayor Jules Roux the year before). In 1949 the governments of the city and the Parish of East Baton Rouge were largely consolidated under then-mayor S. Powers Higginbotham, and in 1982 they were fully merged into a single governing body (similar to a consolidated city-county, although the municipalities of Baker, Central, and Zachary remain self-governing). At that time, the title of "mayor" changed to "mayor-president," being that they were now both mayor of Baton Rouge and president of East Baton Rouge Parish. Indeed, three recent mayor-presidents resided in Baker or Zachary at the time of their elections, giving them the distinction of serving as mayor of Baton Rouge without actually living there. No candidate from the City of Central has been elected mayor-president yet, although Mack A. "Bodi" White, Jr. came very close to doing so in 2016 by receiving 48.2% of the vote.

No families have dominated the office over the years, although Baton Rouge's longest-serving mayor—Wade Bynum (24 years over two different periods of time)—did replace his brother Turner Bynum after he died in office, and Mary Webb was later appointed by the city council to complete the term of her late husband, Jesse Webb, Jr. Although most of Baton Rouge's mayors have been white male Democrats, the last four mayor-presidents have included multiple Republicans and African Americans, as well as a woman. The current mayor-president is Sharon Weston Broome.

List of magistrates, mayors, and mayor-presidents
Below is a list of Baton Rouge's chief executives—magistrates from 1818 to 1846, mayors from 1846 to 1949, and mayor-presidents from 1949 to present. The town magistrate was an appointive office, determined from within the elected five-member board of selectmen. All city mayors and city-parish mayor-presidents were otherwise popularly elected, unless specified below.

Note: an asterisk denotes that the 1872–73 mayoral term featured two competing claims to the title, one from a Republican-controlled city government led by Henry Schorten and one from a Democratic-controlled city government led by Jordan Holt and, later, James Essex Mason Elam; for what it is worth, Schorten physically occupied the actual mayor's chair in the city hall, effectively making the Holt and Elam administrations a rump government.

See also
 Timeline of Baton Rouge, Louisiana

References

 
Baton Rouge metropolitan area
 
baton